Picrorrhyncha atribasis is a moth in the Carposinidae family. It was described by Alexey Diakonoff in 1950. It is found in Punjab, India.

References

Natural History Museum Lepidoptera generic names catalog

Carposinidae
Moths described in 1950